The political balance in Louisiana was heavily affected by the post-Hurricane Katrina departure from New Orleans. Heavily Democratic New Orleans lost some 1/3 of its population. The overall effect reduced the Democrats' base of support in the state and turned Louisiana into a Republican-leaning state thereafter. New Orleans remained Democratic, electing Mitch Landrieu as mayor in February 2010. In the 2008 elections, Louisiana sent a mixed result, with the election of U.S. Senator John McCain for President and the reelection of Democratic U.S. Senator Mary Landrieu. The other senator, at the time, was Republican David Vitter.

Since that election, Republicans have rapidly come to control nearly every federal and statewide office. Both US Senators, Bill Cassidy and John Kennedy, are Republicans. Republicans also hold five of the six U.S. Representative seats from Louisiana. Every statewide office, with the exception of governor, is held by a Republican, and both chambers of the state legislature are majority Republican. By contrast, in 1960, not a single Republican served in either house of the Louisiana legislature. The first Republicans to serve in the legislature since Reconstruction were not elected until 1964, and both—Morley A. Hudson and Taylor W. O'Hearn—came from Shreveport. 

In 2010, several Democrats switched parties bringing the statehouse under Republican control. In 2011, the special election victories of Fred Mills and Jonathan Perry switched the balance of power in the state senate, leaving Republicans in control of the state legislature for the first time since Reconstruction. Also, the party switch of Attorney General Buddy Caldwell caused the Republican party to control every statewide office. However, this was broken in 2015, when Democrat John Bel Edwards won the governor's race.

Republicans won the first Senate seat since Reconstruction in 2004, with the election of David Vitter. He became the first popularly elected Republican Senator as well. In 2014, Republicans won both Senate seats for the first time since 1872.

Voting System
Since 1977 state elections in Louisiana have used a unique system similar to the majority-runoff system used in some other jurisdictions, which in Louisiana has become known as a “jungle” primary or Louisiana primary or an  "open" primary, where all the candidates for an office run together in one election. If someone gets a majority, that individual wins outright; otherwise, the top two candidates, irrespective of partisan affiliation, meet in a runoff election. This primary system is used for state, parish, municipal, and congressional races, but is not used for presidential elections.

Louisiana is one of only five states that elects its state officials in odd-numbered years. (The others are Kentucky, Mississippi, New Jersey, and Virginia). Louisiana holds elections for these offices every four years in the year preceding a presidential election.  Thus, the two most recent gubernatorial elections in Louisiana took place in 2015 and 2019. Louisiana is one of 18 states that run separate elections for governor and lieutenant governor, a process that has resulted in governor-lieutenant governor pairs from different parties and/or widely differing political ideologies. 

Louisiana's unique primary system was instituted in 1975 by Democratic governor Edwin Edwards. Until 1997, the open primary election was held in October, meaning that no election would be held in November if the leading candidate won over 50 percent of the vote in October. Between 2008 and 2010, federal races did not use the jungle primary system. Between the passage of the Voting Rights Act of 1965 and Shelby County v. Holder (a 2013 Supreme Court case), changes to Louisiana election law required preclearance with the United States Department of Justice.

Elections in Louisiana fall under the purview of the secretary of state. In a 2020 study, Louisiana was ranked as the 24th hardest state for citizens to vote in.

See also
 New Orleans mayoral elections
 Political party strength in Louisiana
 2020 Louisiana elections
 United States presidential elections in Louisiana

References

External links
Geaux Vote at the Louisiana Secretary of State official website

Louisiana Elections & Politics from The Times-Picayune newspaper
 

 
Political events in Louisiana
Government of Louisiana